The Final Destination (also known as Final Destination 4) is a 2009 American 3D supernatural horror film written by Eric Bress and directed by David R. Ellis. It is the fourth installment in the Final Destination film series and the second standalone sequel after Final Destination 3, and stars Bobby Campo, Shantel VanSanten, and Mykelti Williamson. Produced by New Line Cinema, the film follows a group of people after they escape a car crash during a race, with Death stalking and killing them one by one.

After the commercial success of Final Destination 3, a fourth film entered in development and was planned to be in 3–D, with Bress writing the script. The script impressed producer Craig Perry and New Line Cinema enough to green-light a fourth installment. James Wong was on board to direct, but because of scheduling conflicts, he decided to drop out. Consequently, the studio executives opted for David R. Ellis to return because of his work on Final Destination 2, who personally accepted because of the 3D. Filming began in March 2008 and ended late May in the same year.

The Final Destination was theatrically released on August 28, 2009, by Warner Bros. Pictures and New Line Cinema. It is the first film in the series to be shot in HD 3D, and is currently the highest-grossing Final Destination film, earning $186 million worldwide. The film received generally negative reviews from critics. The fifth film in the franchise, Final Destination 5, was released in August 2011.

Plot

In 2009, college student Nick O'Bannon watches an auto race with his girlfriend Lori Milligan and their friends Hunt Wynorski and Janet Cunningham at the McKinley Speedway for their semester break. Nick suffers a premonition of an accident from the racetrack that sends debris into the grandstand, causing its front stretch to collapse. When Nick panics, a scuffle breaks out and several people leave the stadium, including Lori, Hunt, Janet, racist tow truck driver Carter Daniels, mother Samantha Lane, mechanic Andy Kewzer, his girlfriend Nadia Monroy, and security guard George Lanter. As Nadia berates the group, a stray tire flies out of the stadium and decapitates her.

On one of the nights following the accident, Carter drives to George's house to burn a cross on his lawn, blaming the guard for preventing him from saving his wife Cynthia at the speedway, but his tow truck ignites him and causes him to be dragged down the street before it explodes. The next day, Samantha is leaving a beauty salon when a rock propelled by a lawnmower is shot through her eye, killing her. After learning of their deaths and similar disasters parallel to the speedway's, Nick becomes convinced that Death is after them. He and Lori return to the speedway with George's help to find the next survivor, Andy, but the next day, Andy is killed at the mechanic shop when a carbon dioxide tank launches him through a metal grid fence. After Nick predicts that Hunt and Janet's deaths will involve water, George and Lori find the latter, who is trapped in a malfunctioning car wash, and narrowly manage to rescue her. However, Nick arrives too late to save Hunt, who accidentally activated a country club's pool drainage system and ended up being disemboweled by the drain pipe.

Four days later, Nick realizes from a news report that another spectator, Jonathan Groves, was rescued after the speedway's collapse; Jonathan had died in the premonition after being asked to move seats, but this never ended up happening due to Nick intervening. Nick and George track Jonathan down at a hospital where he was recovering from the accident, only to witness him being crushed by an overflowing bathtub falling through the ceiling. As they leave, Nick receives a premonition of a multitude of explosions at the mall that leads to Janet and Lori's deaths, but fails to save George, who is run over by a speeding ambulance before Nick could warn him. Nick runs back to the mall to try and stop the explosion before it occurs. Despite being pinned to a wall by a nail gun, he manages to stop a fire before it spreads to several combustible barrels, saving everyone.

Two weeks later, Nick, Lori, and Janet go to a café to celebrate. During their conversation however, Nick starts to see more omens and alludes to the theory that the chain of events since the speedway disaster was meant to lead them to where they needed to be for Death to strike. Just as he realizes this, a loose scaffold outside collapses on the road, causing a truck to swerve and crash into the café, killing him, Lori, and Janet.

Cast

Production

Development
After the success of Final Destination 3, which was initially planned to be in 3D, Eric Bress wrote a script, which impressed producer Craig Perry and Warner Bros. enough to green-light a fourth installment. James Wong was on board to direct, but because of scheduling conflicts with Dragonball Evolution, he decided to drop out. Consequently, the studio executives opted for David R. Ellis to return because of his work on Final Destination 2. He accepted because of the 3D. For the 3D, Perry said that he wanted it to add depth to the film instead of just "something pop[ping] out at the audience every four minutes."

Filming

Although shooting was to be done in Vancouver, which was where the previous three films were shot, David R. Ellis convinced the producers to shoot in New Orleans instead to bring business to the city, and because the budget was already large. The opening crash sequence at "McKinley Speedway" was filmed at Mobile International Speedway in Irvington, Alabama. Filming began in March 2008 and ended in late May in the same year. Reshoots were done in April 2009 at Universal Studios Florida.

Music

Soundtrack
The soundtrack album was released on August 25, 2009, three days before the film's theatrical release, under public record label JVC/Sony Music Australia. The album consists of 23 cues composed and mixed by Brian Tyler. He took over scoring the series after the untimely death of the composer for the first three films, Shirley Walker.

Commercial songs from the film, but not on the soundtrack

 "Devour" by Shinedown
 "How the Day Sounds" by Greg Laswell
 "Burning Bridges" by Anvil
 "Why Can't We Be Friends?" by War
 "Don't You Know" by Ali Dee and the Deekompressors
 "Faraway" by Dara Schindler
 "Dream of Me" by Perfect
 "Make My" by The Roots
 "The Stoop" by Little Jackie
 "Sweet Music" by Garrison Hawk
 "Corona and Lime" by Shwayze
 "Make You Crazy" by Brett Dennen

Score
The CD features the score, composed and conducted by Brian Tyler, and performed by the Czech Philharmonic Orchestra, which omits commercially released songs that were featured in the film.

U.S. edition

 "The Final Destination" – 2:56
 "The Raceway" – 3:07
 "Memorial" – 2:46
 "Nailed" – 3:22
 "Nick's Google Theory" – 1:30
 "Revelations" – 2:28
 "Raceway Trespass" – 1:39
 "Stay Away from Water" – 2:38
 "Flame On" – 1:43
 "Moment of Joy" – 1:17
 "Signs and Signals" – 2:51
 "George Is Next" – 1:12
 "Car Washicide" – 3:05
 "Newspaper Clues" – 1:57
 "Premonition" – 1:50
 "The Salon" – 3:53
 "Questioning" – 1:04
 "Death of a Cowboy" – 2:08
 "Gearhead" – 1:56
 "Sushi for Everyone" – 2:53
 "The Movie Theater" – 3:03
 "You Can't Dodge Fate" – 1:28
 "The Final Destination Suite" – 13:29

The soundtrack attracted generally favorable reviews. Christian Clemmensen of Filmtracks.com gave the score 3 out of 5 stars and felt Tyler was "capable [...] to further explore new stylistic territory while making substantial use of the structures and tone of [predecessor composer] Shirley Walker's music." His approach to the scores were called "intelligent", and provide "adequate if not strikingly overachieving recordings is testimony to his immense talents."

The reviewers were also impressed with the extension of the sound used by Walker in Final Destination 3. "It relates to an affection for Walker's contribution to the industry," said an unnamed critic.

A SoundNotes reviewer grades the film with an impressive score of 7.5/10, remarking "Brian Tyler slugs his way through the inadequacies of The Final Destination and produces a score with reasonable entertainment value and enough of an appeal to make it function well apart from the woeful film."

Release
The film was released in 3D as well as in conventional theaters on August 28, 2009. It was initially planned for an August 14 release. It was also the first 3D film to feature D-BOX motion feedback technology in select theaters.

Box office
According to USA Today and Newsday, The Final Destination debuted at the top of the North American box office, beating Rob Zombie's Halloween II, earning $28.3 million during its first weekend. It has also topped the box office in the UK. The film remained at #1 in North America for two weeks, making it the first, and only, film in the series to top the box office. On September 11, 2009, it gained just over a million dollars and dropped to No. 7. The film grossed $66.4 million domestically and $119.3 million in foreign sales, with a total of $186.2 million worldwide, making it the highest-grossing film in the franchise.

Home media
The Final Destination was initially scheduled for a DVD and Blu-ray Disc release on December 22, 2009. The film was pushed back to January 5, 2010, in the US. Both the DVD and Blu-ray Disc included two pairs of 3D glasses with each set and featured a 2D version on the disc, along with additional scenes. Only the Blu-ray Disc version included two alternate endings, a "making of" featurette about the deaths, storyboard visualization and a preview of A Nightmare on Elm Street (2010). The Blu-ray Disc release, also a combo pack, includes a standard DVD of the film.

In Target stores, some of the DVDs included an exclusive Final Destination comic book.

Reception
Review aggregator Rotten Tomatoes reports that 27% of 99 critics gave the film a positive review, with an average rating of 4.10/10. The site's consensus states: "With little of the ingenuity of previous installments, The Final Destination is predictable, disposable horror fare." On Metacritic, the film has a weighted average score of 30 out of 100 based on reviews from 14 critics, indicating "generally unfavorable reviews".

Jordan Mintzer of Variety magazine wrote: "With an array of gory mayhem only marginally enhanced by 3-D and a plot as developed as a text message, The Final Destination may finally sound the death knell for New Line's near-immortal horror franchise."
Kirk Honeycutt of The Hollywood Reporter wrote: "The new gimmick here is that all the flying body parts and absurd impalements come in 3D. And that's about as inspired as anything gets in this edition. Story and character get chucked to the sidelines as the arena has room for only death scenes."

In January 2022, Stephen Rosenberg of MovieWeb ranked the movies of the franchise from worst to best, ranking The  Final Destination as the worst of the film series. Rosenberg said that it was better likened to a "straight-to-video or early 2000s SyFy original film". Rosenberg also said that none of the actors were memorable and that the dialogue was "chock-full of meta 3D film advertisements".

References

External links
 
 
 

2009 films
2009 horror films
2009 3D films
2000s supernatural horror films
American 3D films
American sequel films
American supernatural horror films
American auto racing films
American teen horror films
D-Box motion-enhanced films
2000s English-language films
Films scored by Brian Tyler
Films about death
Films directed by David R. Ellis
Films set in 2009
Films shot in Florida
Films shot in Mobile, Alabama
Films shot in New Orleans
Final Destination 4
Alliance Films films
New Line Cinema films
Warner Bros. films
Films about the Ku Klux Klan
Films set in a movie theatre
2000s American films